Pulau Besar (meaning Big Island in Malay language) may refer to:

 Pulau Besar (Johor), an island in the South China Sea off the east coast of Johor, Malaysia
 Pulau Besar (Malacca), an island in the Strait of Malacca off the coast of Melaka, Malaysia